is a former Japanese football player.

Club statistics

References

External links

1984 births
Living people
Association football people from Kyoto Prefecture
Japanese footballers
J1 League players
J2 League players
Kyoto Sanga FC players
Albirex Niigata players
Tokushima Vortis players
Association football midfielders